Basil Jordain Ward (6 August 1889 – 29 March 1972) was an Irish first-class cricketer.

Ward was born at Dublin in August 1889, where he was educated at Mountjoy School. After finishing his schooling, he went up to Trinity College, Dublin in 1908, where he played club cricket for Dublin University. He did not appear regularly for the university until 1912, but did represent Leinster alongside. Ward made his debut in first-class cricket for Ireland against Scotland at Dublin in 1912. He played in the same fixture in 1913 at Edinburgh, and in 1914 at Dublin. Ward served in the British Army during World War I, enlisting in August 1915 as a Second Lieutenant in the Royal Field Artillery. Surviving the war, he returned to playing club cricket for Dublin University. He made a final first-class appearance for Ireland against Scotland at Edinburgh in 1920, a year in which he also played minor matches against Cambridge University and Derbyshire at College Park, Dublin. Ward played in a total of four first-class matches, scoring 56 runs with a highest score of 17. However, it is a fast-medium bowler that is better remembered, where alongside an impressive club record, Ward also took 13 first-class wickets, at an average of 21.00, with best innings figures of 4/66. A schoolteacher by profession, he took up a teaching position in London soon after his final appearance for Ireland. He died at Wandsworth Common in London in March 1972.

References

External links

1889 births
1972 deaths
Cricketers from Dublin (city)
People educated at Mount Temple Comprehensive School
Alumni of Trinity College Dublin
Irish cricketers
British Army personnel of World War I
Royal Field Artillery officers
Schoolteachers from Dublin (city)
Irish expatriate sportspeople in England